Simon House is at 33 Daveys Bay Road, Mount Eliza in Melbourne, Australia. The house was constructed in the 1960s during the period of architectural experimentation on materiality and structure in houses. Simon House was the first project received on the day when Guilford Bell and Neil Clerehan opened their office in South Yarra. The Simons were Clerehan's partners but the house was a collaboration of partners. Therefore, the house has a mixture of both Clerehan and Bell's typical style of architecture.

Description 
The house is a single-storey house, planned in a rectangular shape. The house consists of five bedrooms, two toilets, two garages, one kitchen, dining room, living room, pool and terrace. The enclosed pool, natural finishes, glazed wall and an extensive view over the bay recalled contemporary Californian house of architects like Craig Ellwood.

Design Approach 
The central core program of the house was a pool and terrace, positioned right in the centre of the house. With the pool and terrace in the centre with programs surrounds 
that engaged with it, allows family members to gather together. It was said that was one of Clerehan's conception of the house where how he deal with the provision of a frame for family life.
The pool and living room aligned on axis, forming the central part of a symmetrical square plan. Then the programs around the pool were given a corresponding position in the house's spatial hierarchy. Because of this distinct insistence of having an equivalent position of programs, the programs are mirrored and consist of dual garages and entrances. It was said that was one of Bell's typical style of architecture.

Bell has been influenced by the architecture and gardens of Japan. As a countryman, he feels, when in the city, a hunger for the freedom of sky and vegetation. He thinks that a building must stand in spectacular relationship to its environment. With the pool and terrace positioned in the centre of the house, the engagement between the indoor and outdoor spaces then became ambiguous. It creates a sense of feeling when one is inside, it will feels like outdoors and when one is outside it will feels like indoors. One of his design principal was that he thinks of views or views from the building first, instead of the form of the building. Therefore, glass panels are used across the living and dining areas to capture the view of the bay.

Current 
Unfortunately, one of the garage have been renovated into a main entrance, also as a living room. Another garage is built right opposite the existing garage. In this approach, it loses the spatial qualities of the house but in turn allows a convenient use to the owner in the house's circulation.

Materiality 
The materiality that uses in the house were unadorned, they are fibrous plaster ceiling left in natural, unpainted stated, flat steel decking roof, timber walls, and reinforced concrete floor slab under concrete block.

Awards 
Neil Clerehan and Guilford Bell has received numerous honours for his architectural works while they were practicing architecture. The Simon House was the most prominent work of Bell Clerehan partnership.
The home beautiful considered the pool, terrace to be one of Australia's outstanding outdoor areas. The Simon house won the Victorian Architecture Medal in 1963-1964.

References 

Houses completed in 1963
Buildings and structures in the Shire of Mornington Peninsula
1963 establishments in Australia
Houses in Melbourne